Asma bint Khumarawayh ibn Ahmad ibn Tulun, known as Qatr al-Nada, was a  Tulunid princess and the principal wife of the sixteenth Abbasid caliph, al-Mu'tadid.

Life  
Qatr al-Nada was offered by her father, Khumarawayh ibn Ahmad ibn Tulun, as part of a marriage alliance to seal an agreement with the Caliph al-Mu'tadid. The agreement, concluded in spring 893, put an end to years of rivalry and fighting between the Tulunids and the Abbasid court, and recognized Khumarawayh as the hereditary ruler of Egypt and Syria, and autonomous from Baghdad, in exchange for an annual tribute. 

Qatr al-Nada was originally intended for one of the Caliph's sons, Ali (the future al-Muktafi), but al-Mu'tadid chose to marry her himself. Qatr al-Nada brought with her a million gold dinars as her dowry, which according to the historian Thierry Bianquis was a "wedding gift that was considered the most sumptuous in medieval Arab history". The Caliph married her by proxy, the jewelry broker Abu Abdallah al-Jawhari ibn al-Jassas, while she was still in Egypt, and she was escorted from there to Baghdad by Ibn al-Jassas and her paternal uncle Abu al-Karadis. She arrived in Baghdad on 3 March 895, an event marked by the luxury and extravagance of her retinue, which contrasted starkly with the impoverished caliphal court.

The 13th-century Baghdadi scholar Taj al-Din Ali ibn Anjab ibn al-Sa'i calls her "one of the most intelligent and regal women who ever lived", and records this anecdote of her wit: when her husband remarked that she had had the good fortune to have married the Caliph, and had no higher achievement to ask God for, she responded that the good fortune was al-Mu'tadid's, for their marriage made her father the Caliph's subject, and that he had nothing more to thank God for.

She died on 8 July 900, and was buried in the caliphal palace at al-Rusafa. In 906, one of her half-sisters, who had probably accompanied her to Baghdad, married al-Mu'tadid's son and successor al-Muktafi.

References

Sources
 
 
 
 

9th-century births
900 deaths
Year of birth unknown
Wives of Abbasid caliphs
9th-century women from the Abbasid Caliphate
Tulunids
9th-century Egyptian people